Regensburg is an electoral constituency (German: Wahlkreis) represented in the Bundestag. It elects one member via first-past-the-post voting. Under the current constituency numbering system, it is designated as constituency 233. It is located in southeastern Bavaria, comprising the city of Regensburg and the district of Landkreis Regensburg.

Regensburg was created for the inaugural 1949 federal election. Since 2017, it has been represented by Peter Aumer of the Christian Social Union (CSU).

Geography
Regensburg is located in southeastern Bavaria. As of the 2021 federal election, it comprises the independent city of Regensburg and the entirety of the Landkreis Regensburg district excluding the Verwaltungsgemeinschaft of Wörth a.d.Donau.

History
Regensburg was created in 1949. In the 1949 election, it was Bavaria constituency 22 in the numbering system. In the 1953 through 1961 elections, it was number 217. In the 1965 through 1972 elections, it was number 220. In the 1976 through 1998 elections, it was number 219. In the 2002 and 2005 elections, it was number 234. Since the 2009 election, it has been number 233.

Originally, the constituency comprised the independent city of Regensburg and the Landkreis Regensburg district. It acquired its current borders in the 2021 election.

Members
The constituency has been held continuously by the Christian Social Union (CSU) since its creation. It was first represented by Max Solleder from 1949 to 1953, followed by Hermann Höcherl from 1953 to 1976. Albert Schedl then served from 1976 to 1980. Maria Eichhorn was representative from 2002 to 2009. Peter Aumer was elected in 2009 for one term, followed by Philipp Lerchenfeld. Aumer was elected again in 2017 and re-elected in 2021.

Election results

2021 election

2017 election

2013 election

2009 election

References

Federal electoral districts in Bavaria
1949 establishments in West Germany
Constituencies established in 1949
Regensburg
Regensburg (district)